R. G. "Stanley" Dougan was an American football coach.  He was the first head football coach at the Jamestown College—now known as the University of Jamestown—in Jamestown, North Dakota, serving for two seasons, from 1914 to 1915, and compiling a record of 6–5–2.

Head coaching record

References

Year of birth missing
Year of death missing
Jamestown Jimmies football coaches
Ohio University alumni